Amir Kandi (also Romanized as Amīr Kandī) is a village in Arshaq-e Markazi Rural District, Arshaq District, Meshgin Shahr County, Ardabil Province, Iran. At the 2006 census, its population was 70, in 13 families.

References 

Tageo

Towns and villages in Meshgin Shahr County